Ilia Darchiashvili (born 21 February 1981) is a Georgian government official, diplomat, and a former bank manager, serving as the Minister of Foreign Affairs of Georgia since 4 April 2022.

Education and early career 
Born in Sighnaghi in then-Soviet Georgia, Darchiashvili graduated from the Tbilisi State University (TSU) with a degree in economics in 2002. He further obtained master's degrees in economics and business administration from the TSU in 2004 and Grenoble School of Management, France, in 2011, respectively. Darchiashvili worked as a manager for the Bank Republic/Société Générale in Tbilisi from 2003 to 2012, when he joined the Ministry of Foreign Affairs of Georgia as a staff member of the Embassy of Georgia to Poland. 

In 2014, Darchiashvili became Deputy Director of the state-run Municipal Development Fund during the first tenure of Prime Minister Irakli Garibashvili and, next year, he was promoted as its Director. In the same year, he was moved to the position of First Deputy Minister of Regional Development and Infrastructure. He then was Ambassador-at-large at the Foreign Ministry from 2016 to 2017. He served as Georgia's Ambassador to Poland from 2017 to 2021. Shortly after Irakli Garibashvili's return as Prime Minister, Darchiashvili became Head of the Administration of the Government of Georgia in March 2021.

Foreign Minister 
On 4 April 2022, Prime Minister Garibashvili appointed him Minister of Foreign Affairs of Georgia after the predecessor, David Zalkaliani stepped down to become Georgia's ambassador to the United States. Darchiashvili's appointment occurred during an unease in the relations with Ukraine caused by the refusal by the Georgian government to join international sanctions against Russia amid the 2022 Russian invasion of Ukraine. Ukrainian Foreign Minister Dmytro Kuleba said he was "looking forward" to working together with the newly appointed Georgian counterpart. In his ministerial capacity, Darchiashvili's first visit was to Brussels for the Meeting of NATO Ministers of Foreign Affairs on 6 April 2022.

Ranks and awards 
Ilia Darchiashvili holds the diplomatic rank of Ambassador Extraordinary and Plenipotentiary.

References

External links 

1981 births
Foreign Ministers of Georgia
Ambassadors of Georgia (country) to Poland
Tbilisi State University alumni
People from Kakheti
Living people